The Jizhong (汲冢 or Jijun 汲君, northern part of present Henan) discovery in AD 279 is an important event in the paleography of ancient China, recorded in the Book of Jin.

A grave robber Biao Zhun 不準 broke into the tomb of King Xiang of Wei (r. 318–296 BC) and found there a corpus of ancient bamboo slips. Their discovery became a source of textological studies that had been impossible since the editorial work of Liu Xiang and Liu Xin of Han.

The importance of the Jizhong discovery is compared to the Guodian discovery for the modern scholarship.

The initial editorial work for the found slips was done by Xun Xu (d. 289), Director of the Imperial Library, though it was questioned by his successors. Among his editions, only two have survived; the large number of quotations shows the extent of Xun Xu work's influence.

Among Jizhong texts, the most profound influence was the Bamboo Annals, but the Bamboo Annals was not the only text retrieved. Collectively known as Jízhŏng shū (汲塚書), it also included Guoyu, I Ching, the Tale of King Mu, Suoyu 瑣語 ("Minor Sayings", anthology of the anomaly accounts zhiguai 志怪), several Warring States period glossaries, and other titles of interest.

Though the majority of the collection have subsequently been lost, the restoration work, which involved identifying a great number of variant scripts as well as collating fragmented bamboo strips and finding parallels in the received literature of the time, sparked renewed interest in ancient texts and epigraphy among Xun Xu's contemporaries such as Lü Chen (呂忱), who extended upon Shuowen Jiezi to write the Zilin, Guo Pu (郭璞), who wrote annotations to Erya, Sancang, Fangyan, Shan Hai Jing, and the Tale of King Mu, and Zhang Hua, who wrote an encyclopedic treatise on wide-ranging topics, supposedly in a thousand scrolls, the Bowuzhi, to note a few.

Since the Book of Sui, the Jizhong cache is broadly referred as the source of the Yi Zhou Shu 逸周書. However, this statement should be accepted with caution. Its source, the Book of Jin, indeed lists "Zhou shu" 周書 among the titles of the Jizhong finds. However, some of the chapters presently contained in this compendium evidently postdate King Xiang'ai.

Sources 
 Edward L. Shaughnessy, Rewriting Early Chinese Texts, NY Press, 2006
 Fang Xuanling et al., Book of Jin 晋书
 Zhang Hua, Bowu Zhi, 博物志

References

Archaeological artifacts of China
279